Agdistis malleana is a moth in the family Pterophoridae. It is known from South Africa and Swaziland.

References

Agdistinae
Moths of Africa
Moths described in 1988